Philip Shishov is a Bulgarian badminton player. In 2016, he became the runner-up of the Hellas International tournament in men's doubles event. He also played for the club of Jonglënster in Luxembourg and won the National Division 2018/2019 Championship as well as the National Cup.

Achievements

BWF International Challenge/Series 
Men's doubles

  BWF International Challenge tournament
  BWF International Series tournament
  BWF Future Series tournament

References

External links 
 
 

Living people
Year of birth missing (living people)
Place of birth missing (living people)
Bulgarian male badminton players
21st-century Bulgarian people